Germán Adrián Ramón Burgos (born 16 April 1969), nicknamed El Mono Burgos, is an Argentine retired professional footballer who played as a goalkeeper, currently a manager.

During his 15-year senior career, he played for Ferro Carril Oeste, River Plate, Mallorca and Atlético Madrid, the latter two clubs in Spain. He was an Argentine international from the mid-1990s to the early 2000s.

After retiring, Burgos worked as assistant coach at several teams under his compatriot Diego Simeone, most notably Atlético Madrid whom they joined in 2011.

Playing career

Club
Born in Mar del Plata, Buenos Aires Province, Burgos started playing professionally with Ferro Carril Oeste. In 1994, he signed with Argentine Primera División giants Club Atlético River Plate where he was dubbed Mono (monkey) because of his height and disheveled appearance, going on to win several titles during his spell, notably the 1994 Apertura where his team did not lose one single match.

Burgos moved abroad in July 1999, joining Spain's RCD Mallorca. During his two-year spell in the Balearic Islands, he played understudy to compatriot Leo Franco. On 27 November 1999, he was suspended for 11 games for punching RCD Espanyol player Manolo Serrano in a match played the previous week, in an action that eluded the referee but was caught on camera.

In the 2001–02 season, Burgos signed with Atlético Madrid, with the capital club in Segunda División. He had his best year in the country in an eventual return to La Liga after a two-year absence, but appeared less in the following two campaigns, retiring at the end of 2003–04 aged 35. 

Burgos was remembered for his performance in a Madrid derby against Real Madrid in the first season back in the top flight of the Colchoneros, in which he saved Luís Figo's penalty kick with his nose, causing a bloody injury; he played on, and his side eventually scored an equaliser to earn a 2–2 draw.

International
Burgos earned 35 caps for Argentina, over seven years. He was second choice at both the 1998 and 2002 FIFA World Cups, backing up Carlos Roa in the former tournament and Pablo Cavallero four years later. 

Burgos was the starter in the latter half of the qualifying campaign for the 2002 World Cup (unseating Roberto Bonano) and it was generally expected that he would be the first choice in the finals, but manager Marcelo Bielsa ultimately chose Cavallero.

Coaching career
In 2010, after working with AD Alcorcón as goalkeepers' coach, Burgos started his managerial career also in Spain, with amateurs RCD Carabanchel. In the following years, he worked as assistant to former club and country teammate Diego Simeone at Catania Calcio, Racing Club de Avellaneda and Atlético Madrid.

Burgos became the first coach in the world to use Google Glass during a competitive game, in April 2014 against Getafe CF. After Simeone was sent to the stands by the referee in the first leg of the 2017–18 UEFA Europa League semi-finals against Arsenal, and was therefore suspended for the second leg and the final after Atlético advanced, he took charge of the team as they defeated Olympique de Marseille. 

With Simeone still suspended, Burgos took over again when Atlético faced Real Madrid in the 2018 UEFA Super Cup, won 4–2 in Estonia. Unable to reach an agreement with the board, he announced his intention to leave at the end of the 2019–20 season.

Burgos was handed his first job as a head coach at the professional level on 14 March 2021, when he signed a contract until the end of the year at Newell's Old Boys with the option to renew it for a further season. He joined midway through the Copa de la Liga Profesional, and his side earned ten points from their remaining eight games, finishing bottom of Zone B. More significantly, they failed to advance from their group in the Copa Sudamericana, and after the conclusion of both tournaments he left by mutual consent.

On 22 February 2022, Burgos replaced Akis Mantzios at the helm of Aris Thessaloniki F.C. in the Super League Greece.

Personal life
Outside football, Burgos was also a musician, having started his career while still an active player. He acted as the frontman of rock band The Garb.

Burgos was successfully treated for cancer in 2003.

Managerial statistics

Honours
River Plate
Argentine Primera División: Apertura 1994, 1996, 1997, 1999; Clausura 1997
Copa Libertadores: 1996
Supercopa Sudamericana: 1997

Atlético Madrid
Segunda División: 2001–02

References

External links

1969 births
Living people
Sportspeople from Mar del Plata
Argentine sportspeople of Spanish descent
Argentine footballers
Association football goalkeepers
Argentine Primera División players
Ferro Carril Oeste footballers
Club Atlético River Plate footballers
La Liga players
Segunda División players
RCD Mallorca players
Atlético Madrid footballers
Argentina international footballers
1998 FIFA World Cup players
2002 FIFA World Cup players
1995 Copa América players
1999 Copa América players
1995 King Fahd Cup players
Argentine expatriate footballers
Expatriate footballers in Spain
Argentine expatriate sportspeople in Spain
Argentine football managers
Argentine Primera División managers
Newell's Old Boys managers
Super League Greece managers
Aris Thessaloniki F.C. managers
Argentine expatriate football managers
Expatriate football managers in Spain
Expatriate football managers in Greece
Argentine expatriate sportspeople in Greece
Atlético Madrid non-playing staff
20th-century Argentine male singers
Argentine rock singers